The Asturian derby (or Derbi astur), is the name given to any association football match contested between Sporting de Gijón and Real Oviedo, the two biggest clubs in Asturias. The rivalry is well-known as one of the strongest, most heated in Spanish football.

History
The first competitive match between the two teams was played on 5 December 1926, after the two main teams in Oviedo (Stadium Ovetense and Deportivo Oviedo) merged to create Real Oviedo. The match, in the Regional Championship of Asturias, was played in El Molinón and Sporting Gijón won by 2–1.

The first official match in the Spanish league was played in February 1929, during the 1929 Segunda División, and Oviedo swept Sporting by 6–2 thanks to four goals from Barril in the second half. In 1944 the first derby in La Liga  was played, and the Carbayones won again 2–1.

On 27 February 1966, just after the kick off of the derby at El Molinón, several people became injured after an avalanche happened in one of the stands of the stadium.

On 29 May 1977 a special derby was held in Oviedo, where Sporting won by 2–1 at Estadio Carlos Tartiere in the penultimate match of the 1976–77 Segunda División, achieving promotion to La Liga and beginning the 'golden years' of the club.

On 15 March 1998, Oviedo won 2–1 in the last derby in La Liga to date. After that season, Sporting were relegated to Segunda División with the worst performance ever in the Spanish top league. This was also the last Asturian derby played at the old Estadio Carlos Tartiere before its closure in May 2000.
 
The first derby at the new Estadio Carlos Tartiere was played on 28 October 2001, being the first ever sell-out for the venue; Sporting beat the locals 2–0.

In 2003, the clubs played the last derby before the relegation of Oviedo to Segunda División B, later dropped to Tercera División due to unpayments. Oviedo won by 2–1. After Oviedo's second goal, one of the stands collapsed and several fans went onto the pitch, without any injured persons. Due to this, Estadio Carlos Tartiere was closed for one game.

After Oviedo were relegated to the lower divisions, the club had to play against Sporting B for several years until their comeback to Segunda División in 2015. In that time, Sporting B won some of the matches played, specially importants the two 4–1 wins, one of them at Carlos Tartiere.

Oviedo and Sporting met again on 9 September 2017, in the fourth round of the 2017–18 Segunda División, breaking the biggest gap ever (14 years) without facing each other in official competitions. The match, played in Gijón, ended with a one-goal draw. Before it, in the surroundings of the stadium, there were altercations between the National Police and the ultras of Sporting Gijón, ending with damage to the buses of both clubs and 12 persons arrested. In the second-leg match played in Carlos Tartiere, Oviedo defeated Sporting by 2–1.

The second derby of the 2019–20 season, initially dated for 29 March 2020, was postponed due to the coronavirus pandemic. It finally was played on 22 June at El Molinón, behind closed doors, and finished with the win of the carbayones by 0–1.

The derby in the society
In April 2000, when both clubs were suffering acute financial trouble, there were rumours about meetings between the board of directors of both clubs to discuss a merger to create a single team in the region called Real Asturias, and also to study the possibility of building a new stadium between Oviedo and Gijón. Supporters of both clubs and the vast majority of the institutions were opposed to this proposal.

In 2017, the Non-governmental organisation Asturies por África (Asturias for Africa) organised an Asturian derby in Gambia, played by local boys, to raise funds to build a new solar-powered well in the village of Ndungu Kebbeh.

Head-to-head statistics

Source:

Head-to-head ranking in La Liga (1929–2021)

•Total: Sporting with 6 higher finishes (and in top tier alone for 22 seasons), Oviedo with 14 higher finishes (and in top tier alone for 18 seasons); as of the end of the 2020–21 season.

Records

All-time goalscorers
The following players have scored 3 or more league goals in the Asturian derby. This includes all La Liga, Segunda División and Copa del Rey matches.

Clean sheets
The following goalkeepers have at least three clean sheets in the Asturian derby. This includes La Liga, Segunda División and Copa del Rey matches.

All-time results

La Liga

Segunda División

Copa del Rey

Regional Championship
The Regional Championship of Asturias was played before La Liga was created. Every year, the winner of the tournament qualified for the Copa del Rey, in that years called Campeonato de España (Spanish Championship).

Trofeo Principado
The Trofeo Principado was a friendly tournament played from 1988 to 1996 between Sporting and Oviedo. In 1996, Real Oviedo won the tournament has been given after winning five editions. Sporting won the 1993 edition and Real Oviedo won the 1996 one after a penalty shootout.

In 2006 and 2007 the tournament was played in a single game format and both teams won one edition.

Other trophies and friendly matches

Women's Asturian derby
Oviedo and Sporting Gijón's women's teams play the Asturian derby since 2017, as Oviedo signed a collaboration agreement with former independent women's club Oviedo Moderno CF. Both teams play in Segunda División Pro.

Despite being officially still named Oviedo Moderno the matches played during the 2017–18 season were considered the first Asturian women's derbies as they started playing with the name of Real Oviedo and their colours. Meanwhile, Sporting Gijón had its women's team since 1995, being named Escuela de Fútbol de Mareo between 1999 and 2016 as part of a collaboration agreement with the city's town hall.

In the first derby, played at Estadio Manuel Díaz Vega in Oviedo, the Carbayonas beat Sporting by 3–0.

Head-to-head statistics

All matches

Games between Oviedo and Sporting B

Head-to-head statistics

All-time results

Games between Sporting and Oviedo B

Head-to-head statistics

All-time results

Matches between reserve teams

Head-to-head statistics

All matches

Source: CIHEFE

Other Asturian derbies

Mining basins derby
The Mining basins derby involves Caudal and Langreo. It is one of the strongest rivalries in the region as one of the oldest.

Head to head

Source

Avilés–Langreo rivalry
Langreo and Avilés hold a fierce rivalry and their games are usually designed as high-risk matches.

Head to head

Gijón derby
Besides Sporting, Gijón Industrial and Ceares play the derby for honourably being the second team in the city.

Head to head

Gijón women's derby
Sporting Gijón and Gijón FF are the two main local teams in women's football. The firsts, part of the team's women's club, were known as Escuela de Fútbol de Mareo until 2016 and the lasts played one season in the top tier and are vinculated to UC Ceares since 2015.

On 21 April 2019 both teams played the first women's football match ever at El Molinón, with 9,700 spectators attending to it.

Head to head

Other minor derbies
Condal v Siero
Derby of the Comarca de Avilés: Avilés v Marino Luanco
Eastern Asturias derby: Llanes v Ribadesella
Langreo derby: Langreo v Tuilla
Low Nalón derby: Mosconia v Praviano
Nalón derby: Asturias v Titánico
SMRA derby: L'Entregu v San Martín

References

Attendance data at Estadio Carlos Tartiere
Attendance data at Estadio El Molinón

Football rivalries in Spain
Sporting de Gijón
Real Oviedo
Football in Asturias
Recurring sporting events established in 1926